The 3rd NWHL All-Star Game took place on February 11, 2018 at TRIA Rink in Saint Paul, Minnesota. A skills competition was held the day prior on February 10, 2018.

Brittany Ott of the Boston Pride and Amanda Leveille of the Buffalo Beauts served as All-Star captains. Of note, Leveille became the first Canadian-born player to serve as a captain in the NWHL All-Star Game. The coaches for the event were Minnesota Whitecaps legend Winny Brodt for Team Leveille, while Winter Games gold medalist Tricia Dunn served in the same capacity with Team Ott. 

The game was contested in two 25-minute periods. With the contest held in Minnesota, each team featured one member of the Minnesota Whitecaps on its roster. Kate Schipper skated for Team Leveille while Sadie Lundquist competed with Team Ott. Katie Million, the Commissioner of the Western Collegiate Hockey Association was also in attendance. The officials selected for both the 2018 NWHL Skills Competition and 2018 NWHL All-Star Game were referee Jordan Kraabel, linesmen Mike Trumble and linesmen Ian Schachte.

Rosters

Game recap
Hayley Scamurra logged a hat trick and an assist as Team Ott emerged victorious in an 8–6 final. Team Leveille member Kelsey Koelzer set an All-Star Game record by scoring four goals. Of note, both Koezler and Scamurra were making their All-Star debuts. 
Other scorers for Team Ott included Alexa Gruschow, Corinne Buie, Jordan Smelker and Amanda Boulier. Of note, Smelker and Boulier both logged assists in the game. Team Ott out-shot Team Leveille, 41–28.

Skills challenge
In the Skills Challenge, Team Leveille defeated Team Ott by a 4–3 tally. The winner was decided in a skate-off between the two captains.

Fastest Skater: Kristin Lewicki, Team Leveille, 13.41 
Hardest Shot: Kelsey Koelzer, Team Leveille, 81 mph
Dunkin Donuts Shooting Accuracy: Corinne Buie, Team Ott, 12.6 seconds
Fastest Goalie Challenge: Team Leveille (Amanda Leveille and Katie Fitzgerald) won the Fastest Goalie challenge, Team Ott won the Howie’s Hockey 
Breakaway contest: Team Ott (participants included Courtney Burke, Sadie Lundquist and Jenny Ryan)

References 

2017–18 NWHL season
2018 National Womens Hockey League All-Star Game
Tourist attractions in Minnesota
2018 in ice hockey
2018 in sports in Minnesota
2017–18 in American women's ice hockey
Premier Hockey Federation All-Star Games
https://scoutingtherefs.com/2018/02/20907/nwhl-star-game-referees-linesmen/